The 2018-19 season was Ulster's 25th season since the advent of professionalism in rugby union, and Dan McFarland's first season as head coach. Rory Best was captain. They competed in the Pro14 and the European Rugby Champions Cup.

After the resignation of Jono Gibbes, Dan McFarland was announced as Ulster's new head coach on 30 April 2018. Initially he was to serve his notice as Scotland's forwards coach and join Ulster in January 2019, with Simon Easterby to act as interim head coach until then. But in August, an agreement was reached with Scotland for McFarland to join Ulster before the new season. Jared Payne, who retired as a player at the end of last season, became the new defence coach. Banbridge head coach Dan Soper joined as skills coach. Shane Logan stepped down as Chief Executive in September 2018, with Jonny Petrie appointed as his successor.

There were significant changes to the playing squad. Aside from Jared Payne, wings Tommy Bowe and Andrew Trimble, scrum-half Paul Marshall, and loose forwards Peter Browne, Jean Deysel and Chris Henry also retired. Also departing were fullback Charles Piutau to Bristol Bears, props Callum Black to Worcester Warriors, Rodney Ah You to Newcastle Falcons and Wiehahn Herbst to the Bulls, out-half Brett Herron to Jersey Reds, and centre Callum Patterson to the Cornish Pirates. Scrum-half Aaron Cairns, flanker Robbie Diack and prop Schalk van der Merwe were released. Out-half Paddy Jackson and centre Stuart Olding, whose contracts were terminated in the fallout from their trial and acquittal for rape, signed for Perpignan and Brive respectively. Rory Best remained captain. 

Ulster were in need of an experienced out-half after the end of Christian Lealiifano's loan period and Jackson's departure. In June they attempted to sign South African out-half Elton Jantjies, but were blocked by the IRFU, who insisted they needed to sign an Irish-qualified player. Leinster's Joey Carbery and Ross Byrne were talked about, but Carbery opted to sign for Munster and Byrne stayed at Leinster. On 18 July, Billy Burns, who qualified for Ireland through his Irish grandfather, was signed from Gloucester.

Other new arrivals were prop Marty Moore, signed from Wasps; flanker Jordi Murphy, from Leinster; utility back Will Addison, from Sale Sharks; wing Henry Speight, from the Brumbies; and, in a short-term loan deal, lock Ian Nagle, from Leinster. Academy players who made their debut for the senior team this season were prop Eric O'Sullivan, wings Robert Baloucoune and Angus Kernohan, centre James Hume, fullback Michael Lowry and flanker Marcus Rea. Former academy prop Tommy O'Hagan also made his senior debut.

In the Pro14, Ulster finished second in Conference B, qualifying for the playoffs and next season's Champions Cup. They defeated Connacht in the quarter-final, but lost to Glasgow Warriors in the semi-final. Ulster led the league in defence. Scrum-half John Cooney and centre Stuart McCloskey made the Pro14 Dream Team. They finished second in Pool 4 of the Champions Cup, making the quarter-finals, where they lost to Leinster. Wing Jacob Stockdale was nominated for European Player of the Year. 

John Cooney was leading scorer with 142 points. Hooker Rob Herring was leading try scorer with eight. Flanker Nick Timoney was leading tackler with 303, just ahead of number eight Marcell Coetzee with 301. Stuart McCloskey was Ulster's Player of the Year. Captain and hooker Rory Best and centre Darren Cave retired at the end of the season.

Staff

Squad

Senior squad

Players In
 Marty Moore from  Wasps
 Jordi Murphy from  Leinster
 Will Addison from  Sale Sharks
 Alexander Thompson from  Terenure
 Billy Burns from  Gloucester
 Alan Bennie from  Lansdowne
 Henry Speight from  Brumbies (short-term deal)
 Ian Nagle from  Leinster (loan deal)

Players Out
 Charles Piutau to  Bristol Bears
 Tommy Bowe retired
 Callum Black to  Worcester Warriors
 Brett Herron to  Jersey Reds
 Paul Marshall retired
 Callum Patterson to  Cornish Pirates
 Andrew Trimble retired
 Stuart Olding to  Brive
 Jared Payne retired
 Paddy Jackson to  Perpignan
 Aaron Cairns to  Ballynahinch
 Peter Browne retired
 Jean Deysel retired
 Chris Henry retired
 Rodney Ah You to  Newcastle Falcons
 Robbie Diack released
 Schalk van der Merwe released
 Wiehahn Herbst to  Bulls

 Internationally capped players in bold
 Irish Provinces are currently limited to four non-Irish eligible (NIE) players and one non-Irish qualified player (NIQ or "Project Player").

Academy squad
Seven players joined the academy this season: back row forward Matthew Agnew, from Malone RFC; out-half Bruce Houston, centre Stewart Moore and back rowers Azur Allison and David McCann, from RBAI; outside back Iwan Hughes, from Bristol Bears; and wing Angus Kernohan, from Ballymena Academy.

European Rugby Champions Cup

Pool 4

Quarter-final

End-of-season honours
Jacob Stockdale was named on the longlist for EPCR European Player of the Year.

Pro14

Quarter-final

Semi-final

End of season awards
Inside centre Stuart McCloskey and scrum-half John Cooney were named the Pro14 Dream Team.

Ulster A

Celtic Cup

Cara Cup

Home attendance

Ulster Rugby Awards
The Heineken Ulster Rugby Awards ceremony was held at the Crowne Plaza Hotel, Belfast, on 9 May 2019. Winners were:

Player of the Year: Stuart McCloskey
Personality of the Year: Rory Best
Young Player of the Year: Eric O'Sullivan
Rugby Writers Player of the Year: Marcell Coetzee
Supporters Club Player of the Year: Stuart McCloskey
Academy Player of the Year: Michael Lowry
Ulster A Player of the Year: Aaron Sexton
Women's Player of the Year: Claire McLaughlin, Old Belvedere R.F.C.
Youth Player of the Year: Matthew Sands, City of Armagh RFC
Boys' Schools Player of the Year: Tom Stewart, Belfast Royal Academy
Girls' Schools Player of the Year: Zara Flack, Enniskillen Royal Grammar School
Real Rugby Heroes Award (adult category): Victor Kearney, Donegal Town RFC
Real Rugby Heroes Award (youth category): Heather Thornton, Rainey Old Boys R.F.C.
Dorrington B. Faulkner Award: Barney McGonigle
Club Player of the Year: Ross Adair, Ballynahinch RFC
Referee of the Year: Peter Martin
Club of the Year: Queen's University RFC
U18 Girls Player of the Year: Kelly McCormill, Cooke RFC

Season reviews
"Ulster’s progression in 2019", The Front Row Union, 8 May 2019
"Making an impact at Ulster Rugby", The Front Row Union, 23 May 2019
Ulster Men: Who did what 2018-19, The From Row Union, 18 July 2019
"Dan McFarland: Season Review", Ulster Rugby, 6 June 2019
"Ulster continue to make strides", United Rugby, 12 June 2019

References

2018-19
2018–19 in Irish rugby union
2018–19 Pro14 by team
2018–19 European Rugby Champions Cup by team